Ameerega yoshina is a species of poison frogs found in central Peru. It was found in the Huallaga Province. It resembles A. bassleri and A. pepperi, but can be differentiated by its advertisement call being slower than its relatives; approximately one-half the speed of A. bassleri and one-quarter the speed of A. pepperi.

References

Further reading
Acioli, Ellen Cristina Serrão, and Selvino Neckel-Oliveira. "Reproductive biology of Ameerega trivittata (Anura: Dendrobatidae) in an area of terra firme forest in eastern Amazonia." Acta Amazonica 44.4 (2014): 473–480.
Portillo, Frank, and Eli Greenbaum. "At the edge of a species boundary: A new and relatively young species of Leptopelis (Anura: Arthroleptidae) from the Itombwe Plateau, Democratic Republic of the Congo." Herpetologica 70.1 (2014): 100–119.

External links

yoshina
Amphibians of Peru
Amphibians described in 2009